Johan Axel Gösta Bladin (26 November 1894 – 4 August 1972) was a Swedish track and field athlete who competed in the 1920 Summer Olympics. In 1920 he finished ninth in the long jump competition. He also participated in the 400 metre hurdles event where he was eliminated in the semi-finals.

References

External links
profile 

1894 births
1972 deaths
Swedish male hurdlers
Swedish male long jumpers
Olympic athletes of Sweden
Athletes (track and field) at the 1920 Summer Olympics
20th-century Swedish people